Dorian Healy (born 11 February 1962) is a British actor, best known for his role as Capt/Maj Kieran Voce in the award-winning drama series Soldier Soldier (1993–1994).

He conceived and co-wrote the TV series Masculine Mescaline with Soldier Soldier co-star Gary Love (Sgt Tony Wilton).

Filmography
Short film for children 'The Three of Us' (1974) with Earl Rhodes and Craig McFarlane
 The Sweeney (Pay Off) ‘speechless boy’
 The Monocled Mutineer as ‘Cockney’ (1986)Journey's End as Mason (1988)Playing the Field as Garry McGreer (1998)Hornblower as Midshipman Jack Simpson in The Even Chance (1998)Young Soul Rebels as Ken (1991)For Queen & Country as Fish (1988)A Christmas Carol as Schoolboy Scrooge (1977)Oliver!'' (1968)

External links

 

1962 births
Living people
English male film actors
English male television actors
Male actors from London
20th-century English male actors
21st-century English male actors